Uneven Justice: The Plot to Sink Galleon is a memoir by Raj Rajaratnam, founder of the Galleon Group, a New York-based hedge fund management firm now ceased in operation; the book was first published in December, 2021 by Post Hill Press.

Background
Raj Rajaratnam served seven and half years in prison of an 11-year sentence after being convicted for insider trading and was released in the summer of 2019.

In 2021, he published his memoir, Uneven Justice: The Plot to Sink Galleon, detailing the events surrounding his insider trading conviction and the prosecutorial overreach he claims led to it.

Uneven Justice tries to shine a light on the US criminal justice system of which the author is critical and knew little until the FBI knocked on his door with guns and placing him under arrest.

Content

Highlights
“Empirical studies have shown that the trial penalty is just about double that handed to those who plead guilty. If a defendant agrees to become a cooperating witness, helping the government with testimony – irrespective of the truth – to convict another defendant, the co-operating witnesses gets a much reduced-sentence and in many cases just parole,”

-- Raj Rajaratnam, the author (at the preface of the book)

Reviews by notable people
“The book, "Uneven Justice", makes a persuasive case that this prosecution served to cover up the embarrassment of the Obama DOJ's malfeasance and advance the ambitious Bharara's career. But its most important point is that the entire justice system is rigged against defendants.

Obviously, few people are going to sympathize with a billionaire hedge fund manager. But that's the point. That's not the book's goal. His case is done. The book is a genuine, serious, in-depth study of all the ways federal prosecutors have unchecked power to destroy people.

Federal prosecutors routinely threaten people's families, conceal exculpatory evidence, exploit the fact that almost anything is a crime, and in general have rigged the system to make acquittal almost impossible. If it takes Rajaratnam to help expose that, this book is welcomed.”

-- Glenn Greenwald, Pulitzer Prize winning Journalist, NY Times Best Selling Author and former constitutional lawyer

References

External links 
 Raj Rajaratnam Speaks with Andrew Ross Sorkin (CNBC) Video Text
 Raj Rajaratnam Interviewed by Walter Pavlo (Forbes) Text
 Preface summarizing Raj Rajaratnam’s tell-all book (The Island (Sri Lanka))

Autobiographies
American autobiographies
Memoirs
2021 books
2021 non-fiction books